Balidan also called Sacrifice, is a 1927 Indian silent film directed by Naval Gandhi and based on a play by Rabindranath Tagore. It was produced by Orient Pictures Corporation. Balidan is cited as one of the top ten lost films of Indian Cinema by P. K. Nair. Hailed as "an excellent and truly Indian film" by The Indian Cinematograph Committee, 1927–28, it was used by them as one of the films to "show how 'serious' Indian cinema could match Western standards".

The film starred the then popular cast of Master Vithal, Sulochana (Ruby Myers), Zubeida, Sultana, Jal Khambata and Jani Babu.

A social-reformist costume drama film, written by Tagore in 1887, it was set in the fictional kingdom of Tippera, and involved clashes between a progressive-minded King and a "tradition-bound priest". The film was stated to be commercially successful.

Cast
 Master Vithal
 Sulochana (Ruby Myers)
 Zubeida
 Sultana
 Jal Khambata
 Jani Babu
 J. Makhijani

References

External links

1927 films
1920s Hindi-language films
Films based on works by Rabindranath Tagore
Indian black-and-white films
Indian silent films